Jungsturm may refer to:
Roter Jungsturm, the youth section of the Roter Frontkämpferbund later renamed into Rote Jungfront
Jungsturm Adolf Hitler, the early youth group of the Nazi Party that was later merged with the Hitler Youth
Jungsturm (Kharkov), a newspaper in Kharkov

See also
Sturmabteilung